Marie Joussaye (1864 in Belleville, Ontario – 24 March 1949 in Vancouver) was a Canadian poet.

Life 
Marie Josie grew up in Belleville. 
She was a newspaper journalist in Toronto. 
In 1893, she was president of the Working Girls' Union.
She moved to Dawson City, Yukon.
In November 1903, she married David Heatherington Fotheringham, a Northwest Mounted Policeman.
They had financial difficulties.
In 1924, she moved to Mayo, Yukon.
In 1929, she moved to Vancouver, where she died in a rooming house on 24 March 1949.

Works 
 The Songs that Quinte Sang (1895)
 Selections from Anglo-Saxon Songs (1918)

References

Sources 

Carole Gerson, "Only a Working Girl: The Story of Marie Joussaye Fotheringham," Northern Review 19 (Winter 1998)

1864 births
1949 deaths
Canadian women poets
19th-century Canadian poets
20th-century Canadian poets
20th-century Canadian women writers
19th-century Canadian women writers